Amir Tizrou  is an Iranian footballer who plays for Sepidrood Rasht S.C. as a defender in the Azadegan League.

References

Damash Gilan players
1983 births
Living people
Siah Jamegan players
Machine Sazi F.C. players
Iranian footballers
Association football defenders
Sportspeople from Gilan province